Yellow Pine is an unincorporated census-designated place in Valley County, Idaho. As of the 2010 census, its population was 32.

History 

In 1906, Albert Behne established the first post office and mail service. In 1924, he received the patent on the 47½ acres where the village presently exists. In 1930, at the age of 76, he platted the original Yellow Pine townsite.

Other original patentees were Oscar Ray Call, Behne's former mining partner, and Henry Abstein.
Although his primary interest was mining, he was also an active horticulturist and many of the apple trees that he planted are still living today. His original holdings have since been subdivided.

Geography 

Yellow Pine is a  "inholder" community in eastern Valley County, located on the East Fork of the South Fork of the Salmon River, approximately half a mile upstream from its confluence with Johnson Creek. It is bounded on the north by the Payette National Forest and on the south by the Boise National Forest. Many of the early miner-settlers came from Warren, Idaho.

Culture and recreation 
It is home to the Yellow Pine Harmonica Festival, which is held the first weekend in August of each year. It is located near Forest camp grounds, rivers and lakes. There are yearly snowmobile trips from Warm Lake to Yellow Pine with overnight accommodations. 

The Frank Church Wilderness Area is known for its hiking trails. The community is surrounded by Unit 25 for Elk, deer, bear, and cougar hunting.

Climate
Yellow Pine has a dry-summer humid continental climate (Köppen Dsb), bordering on a subarctic climate (Dfc). Summers are pleasant, with warm days and chilly nights with lows close to freezing. Winters are cold and snowy, with lows reaching the single digits and annual snowfall averaging 104 inches (264 cm). Max snowpack depth averages 24 inches (61 cm) and is usually reached during the month of February.

References

Local histories
Cox, Lafe & Emma. Idaho Mountains/Our Home, Life in the Idaho's Back County. VO Ranch Books, 1997.
Sumner, Nancy. Yellow Pine, Idaho, (printed privately).

External links
The Yellow Pine Times
Yellow Pine Music & Harmonica Festival

Census-designated places in Valley County, Idaho
Census-designated places in Idaho